Chatra Lok Sabha constituency is one of the 14 Lok Sabha (parliamentary) constituencies in Jharkhand state in eastern India. It covers the entire Chatra and Latehar districts and part of Palamu district

Vidhan Sabha segments
Presently, Chatra Lok Sabha smallestconstituency in jharkhandcomprises the following five Vidhan Sabha (legislative assembly) segments:

Until 1977, Chatra was one of the vast Parliamentary constituencies with parts of Gaya, Hazaribag and Palamu districts. The districts of Chatra and Latehar came into being much later.
Sans Panki, all the assembly segments namely Chatra, Simaria, Latehar and Manika are reserved seats, whereas Chatra continues to be an unreserved Parliamentary constituency.

Members of Lok Sabha
1957: Vijaya Raje, Chota Nagpur Santhal Parganas Janata Party
1962: Vijaya Raje, Swatantra
1967:   V.Raje (Vijaya Raje), Independent
1971: Shankar Dayal Singh, Indian National Congress
1977: Sukhdeo Verma, Janata Party
1980: Ranjit Singh, Indian National Congress
1984: Yogeshwar Prasad Yogesh, Indian National Congress
1989: Upendra Nath Verma, Janata Dal
1991: Upendra Nath Verma, Janata Dal
1996: Dhirendra Agarwal, Bharatiya Janta Party
1998: Dhirendra Agarwal, Bharatiya Janta Party
1999: Nagmani Kushwaha, Rashtriya Janata Dal
2004: Dhirendra Agarwal, Rashtriya Janata Dal
2009: Inder Singh Namdhari, Independent
2014: Sunil Kumar Singh, Bharatiya Janta Party
2019: Sunil Kumar Singh, Bharatiya Janta Party

Election results

2019 Lok Sabha

1984 Lok Sabha 
 Yogeshwar Prasad Yogesh (INC) : 211,020 votes    
 Shukdeo Prasad Verma (ICJ) : 54,478

See also
 Chatra district
 List of Constituencies of the Lok Sabha

Notes

Lok Sabha constituencies in Jharkhand
Chatra district
Latehar district